The Battle of Sudak took place in 1221 or 1222 when Rus-Kipchak forces under Rus’ leadership attempted to capture the city from the Seljuks of Rum.

The Seljuks of Rum under Kayqubad I took control of Sudak in 1221 or 1222. Following the seizure of the city a joint Cuman-Rus army under Rus leadership led an attempt to take the city, this attempt was defeated by the Seljuk Turks.

References

Seljuk Empire
Battles involving the Seljuk Empire
Sudak